Let It Go is the sixth studio album from heavy metal band Galactic Cowboys. It was released on June 20, 2000.

Notes
 Several of the songs on this album were originally written by Monty Colvin for a solo project, but were used instead on this album, since they were appropriate for the Galactic Cowboys style.
 The boy on the cover of this album is the son of Donovan White, who played guitar on the Crunchy album All Day Sucker.
The album has lead vocal contributions from all members: Ben Huggins, Wally Farkas and Monty Colvin.
Former drummer Alan Doss mixed the album, and contributed some backing vocals.
King's X drummer Jerry Gaskill played most of the drums on the album. Wally also did drums on some tracks.
The album has a rather strange intro proclaiming the band to have "a new sound for a new millennium" - hip hop. This leads us into a false sense of insecurity, before the opening riff of "T.I.M." plays.
The final track "The Record Ends" is the longest track on any Galactic Cowboys album. However, most of the latter part of the track is a cacophonous collage of sounds and samples.

Track listing

Personnel
Ben Huggins - Vocals, guitar
Wally Farkas - Vocals, guitar, drums, keyboards, organ
Monty Colvin - Vocals, bass
Jerry Gaskill - Drums, vocals

Guest Musicians
 Alan Doss – engineer, mixing, tone generator, vocal harmony
 Max Dyer – cello
 Shane Huggins
 Ty Tabor – tone generator
 Tamra Perkinson – background vocals (track 11)
 Nano Jones – drum machine (track 12)
 Robert Rich – soundscapes
 The Little LaLa People

References

External links
Let It Go lyrics

2000 albums
Galactic Cowboys albums